Jon Day is a British writer, critic and academic. He teaches English at King's College London. His essays and reviews have appeared in the London Review of Books, n+1, the New York Review of Books, The Times Literary Supplement, and The Guardian. He is also a regular fiction critic for The Daily Telegraph and the Financial Times, and writes about art for Apollo magazine.

Day's first book, Cyclogeography, a philosophical memoir about the years he spent as a London bicycle courier, was published in 2015 to critical acclaim. His second, Homing, was published in 2019. He was a judge for the 2016 Man Booker Prize, and for the 2019 Wellcome Book Prize.

References 

21st-century English writers
English critics
Year of birth missing (living people)
Living people
Academics of King's College London
Alumni of St John's College, Oxford
Financial Times people
The Daily Telegraph people
The Times journalists
The Guardian journalists